John Arnold Bidgood (30 May 1902 – 9 September 1975) was an Australian rules footballer who played with St Kilda in the Victorian Football League (VFL).

Family
The son of George Bidgood (1861-1936), and Margaret Bidgood (1865-1940), née Patterson, John Arnold Bidgood was born at Mornington, Victoria on 30 May 1902.

He married Ethel Gibson (1902-1992) in 1928.

Football

Mornington (PFA)
He played for the Mornington Football Club in the Peninsula Football Association from, at least, 1920,
 until, at least, 1927.

He was part of Mornington's 1922 and 1927 Premiership teams.

St Kilda
Granted a permit to play with St Kilda on 29 April 1925, he played (on the wing) in his single game with the St Kilda First XVIII, against Hawthorn, at the Junction Oval, on 9 May 1925.

Notes

References

External links 

1902 births
1975 deaths
Australian rules footballers from Victoria (Australia)
St Kilda Football Club players
People from Mornington, Victoria